Meltem Yıldızhan (born 5 August 1999) is a Turkish female basketball player. The  national plays Power forward.

Career

Galatasaray
She started his basketball career in Galatasaray infrastructure. At the age of 16, she found herself a place in the Galatasaray Women's Basketball Team.

She signed a new two-year contract with Galatasaray on 25 May 2021.

Nesibe Aydın loan
In the statement made on May 25, 2021, it was announced that he will play in Nesibe Aydın, one of the Turkish Women's Basketball Super League teams, on loan in the 2021-22 season.

References

External links
 Meltem Yıldızhan at Tbf.org

1999 births
Living people
Galatasaray S.K. (women's basketball) players
Turkish women's basketball players
Basketball players from Istanbul
Power forwards (basketball)
Nesibe Aydın GSK players